Umeme Limited is the largest energy distributor in Uganda, distributing about 97 percent of all electricity used in the country. The shares of the stock of the company are listed on the Uganda Securities Exchange (USE) and are cross listed on the Nairobi Stock Exchange (NSE). As of December 2021, the company's total assets were approximately UGX:2.664 trillion (US$706 million), with shareholders' equity of approximately UGX:893.15 billion (US$251.3 million).

Location
The registered offices of the company are located at Rwenzori House, 1 Lumumba Avenue, in the central business district of Kampala, the capital and largest city of Uganda. The geographical coordinates of the company headquarters are 00°19'00.0"N, 32°34'46.0"E (Latitude:0.316667; Longitude:32.579444).

Formation
Umeme was formed in 2004 when the government of Uganda leased the Uganda Electricity Distribution Company Limited to a consortium belonging to Globeleq (56 percent), a subsidiary of the Commonwealth Development Corporation of the United Kingdom, and Eskom of South Africa (44 percent). The transfer of assets did not take place until 1 March 2005.

During 2006, the consortium formed by Globeleq and Eskom was restructured, with Globeleq becoming the sole owner of Umeme.

On 15 October 2012, Umeme became a listed company on the Uganda Securities Exchange (USE). A total of 622,378,000 shares, representing approximately 38 percent of its issued share capital at the time, became listed on the Ugandan bourse in an initial public offering (IPO). The shares of the company started trading on the USE on 30 November 2012. Umeme shares were first cross-listed on the NSE on 14 December 2012, with active trading commencing on 31 July 2013. The company expected to use the proceeds from the IPO, estimated at UGX:171 billion, to expand its power distribution network and payoff debt.

Ownership
As of December 2021, the ten largest shareholders in the stock of the company were as illustrated in the table below: As of December 2017, the company shares were held by institutional investors (72 percent) and retail investors (28 percent).

Governance
Umeme is governed by a ten-person board of directors. They were re-elected at the 9th Annual General Meeting held on 6 May 2021, and they include the following people

Management structure
Umeme is structured into twelve management departments, each headed by a senior manager. The senior managers form the executive committee, whose members were the following as of 1 June 2018:

Under the executive committee, Umeme has 25 other managers who assist the executives to implement company policy and run the company on a daily basis. In March 2015, Selestino Babungi was appointed managing director, replacing Charles Chapman who served in that role from February 2009 until March 2015.

Unreliability of service

Within Uganda, Umeme is known for chronic unreliability and has been accused of corruption. Customers frequently face extended service outages, which are occasionally followed by protests, riots, and assaults on Umeme employees.

Protests and rioting

In 2010, protests erupted after a two-week power blackout in the town of Bugembe. Attempts to disperse the protesters led to violent clashes between police and irate residents. Nine were arrested, with eight being charged with inciting violence, staging an unlawful and violent assembly, and insulting the police.

In 2011, a two-month power outage led to protests in Jinja. Residents and business owners built barricades, set tires ablaze, and blocked traffic. Police responded with tear gas and live ammunition. Days later, over 100 people were dispersed by riot police using tear gas and rubber bullets after marching on Umeme's offices in protest of recurring outages in Masaka town.

In 2012, after a month-long outage along the Kampala–Gayaza Road, stone-throwing protesters caused property damage and injuries.

In 2014, a Umeme manager in Mubende was beaten severely by an infuriated mob during power-related protests at the Kasambya trading centre. The ensuing battle between rioters and security forces resulted in 15 arrests and one other injury, including a trader who was shot twice. Later that year, Kampala print and publishing shop owners went on strike, blocked Nasser road, and burnt paper and plastic to protest six-day power cuts along the road. Security forces used tear gas to disperse the protesters.

In November 2018, hundreds of people demonstrated in front of Umeme's office in Gulu Town in north Uganda. Many people involved in business were complaining that the frequent power outages raise their costs and prevent them from properly managing their ventures. The crowd was joined by MPs supportive of the protesters. Although the demonstration was peaceful, security forces fired teargas to stop it. One person was shot in the buttock.

Recommendations by parliament

In 2013, a probe committee of Uganda's Parliament recommended cancellation of Umeme's contract due to its chronic failure to provide reliable services, which would trigger a contract severance payment of at least US$148 million.

The following year, Uganda's Parliament recommended that Umeme's "contract should be terminated” due to the gross manipulations encountered in the procurement of the Umeme concession, and the scandalous provisions of the power distribution agreements signed between the government of Uganda and Umeme. Ultimately, this course of action was decided against because it would have been too expensive and politically complicated.

Power losses
In June 2016, Umeme estimated its total power losses across its network at 19.1 percent. In September 2016, Umeme estimated that it lost UGX:106 billion annually from nonpayment of bills, vandalism, and illegal connections. Fifty-one percent of its losses come from the Bugisu sub-region in the Eastern Region.

In June 2015, Umeme estimated its power losses at 19.2 percent. Of that, 13 percent was attributable to technical losses (resulting from poor network configuration) and 6.2 percent was from commercial losses (such as power theft and under-billing). In 2017, Umeme's power losses were reduced to 17.2 percent. Umeme planned to reduce total power loss to 15 percent by 2018. According to Umeme, power losses had been reduced to 16.4 percent, as of December 2019.

In August 2021, Umeme's metering service manager, Christine Namutebi announced the disconnection of over 8,000 illegal connections and the arrest of more than 4,000 individuals, for electricity theft and unauthorized connection to the national grid. The areas most violated by energy thieves include Kampala Metropolitan Area, Jinja Metropolitan Area, Mbale District, Masaka District and Mityana District.

History

In May 2010, Umeme's communications director Charlotte Kemigyisha wrote a commentary in the Daily Monitor newspaper urging public support for President Yoweri Museveni's proposal to make electricity theft a capital offense.

In December 2010, Umeme announced plans to invest US$32 million during 2011 in new substations, improvements in grid connectivity, and the introduction of pre-payment systems.

In November 2013, Umeme announced that it had secured loans totaling US$190 million from the International Finance Corporation, Standard Chartered Bank, and Stanbic Bank to fund grid expansion and reduce energy losses.

Umeme is spending US$440 million between 2013 and 2018 to overhaul equipment, buy technology, and add distribution points.

In March 2016, the Daily Monitor newspaper reported that Umeme had signed a contract with the Uganda Electricity Transmission Company Limited to distribute the power generated from the Isimba Hydroelectric Power Station, due online in 2018, and the Karuma Hydroelectric Power Station, due online in 2020.

In September 2016, a senior Umeme executive said that the company planned to spend US$2 billion over the next five years to expand the grid and increase access rates from an estimated 20 percent in 2016 (about 900,000 subscribers) to 40 percent in 2020 (about 3 million subscribers). In December 2017, Umeme announced plans to invest US$155 million in 2018, to improve the distribution network, build new substations and refurbish old networks across Uganda. In May 2018, in an interview with Reuters, Celestino Babungi, the CEO of Umeme, announced that the company planned to raise US$1.2 billion to revamp and expand the national distribution grid over the next seven years. A consultant was hired to advise and guide on how to raise the funds.

In June 2019, the Daily Monitor newspaper reported that Umeme planned to borrow US$70 million from the International Finance Corporation to add to the US$255 million raised internally, in order to invest in network upgrades and expansion while reducing network losses along with increased collection targets during the 2019–2024 time frame.

In December 2019, Umeme received a syndicated loan of US$70 million from four financial institutions as laid down in the table below. A portion of the loan will be utilized to set up distribution systems to effectively distribute power from Isimba and Karuma. Part of the loan will also support extension of power to industrial parks, upgrading Umeme's network, building the backbone on which more electricity connections will be supplied, accelerate prepayment metering and reduce energy losses. Two hundred and thirty thousand customers out of the 1.4 million customers that Umeme services, as of December 2019, are in the process of being converted from post-service billing to pre-paid metering. At that time, total energy losses stood at 16.7 percent, of which 11.7 percent were technical and 5 percent were commercial.

Customer base
As of January 2016, Umeme's customer base was about 790,000, with approximately 16,000 customers being added every month. The company expected its customer base to exceed 1 million by the end of 2016.

As at 30 June 2017, Umeme exceeded 1,000,000 paying customers, with the numbers growing at a rate of 13 percent annually.

According to the Daily Monitor, as of April 2018, Umeme had  1,125,291 customers. Seventy percent of those customers were on the pre-paid metering system, known as "Yaka". By June 2019, Umeme's customer base exceeded 1.4 million connections.

By July 2018, pre-paid metering covered an estimated 80 percent of all Umeme's customers. At that time, the customer mix was as illustrated in the table below:

As of December 2018, Umeme serviced more than 1.3 million customers, representing an estimated 25 percent of Uganda's population.

As of December 2019, Umeme serviced in excess of 1.5 million customers, of whom 1.47 million (98 percent) were on the prepaid metering service called "Yaka". As of May 2020, Umeme expected to increase its customer base by 2 million to bring total number of customers to 3.5 million by 2025. In June 2020, the utility company expected to add 300,000 new customers to the network in 2020. At that time Umeme had plans to invest US$450 million (USh1.7 trillion), between 2019 and 2025, to (a) increase demand of electricity (b) increase reliability of supply (c) increase number of grid connections and (d) reduce power losses. By December 2020, Umeme's customer base had expanded to 1,530,000 customers, of whom an estimated 97 percent were on the pre-metered Yaka billing system.

According to the Electricity Regulatory Authority the customer mix among Ugandan electricity consumers, as of June 2021, was as represented in the tab below.

Customer growth
The table below represents the growth trajectory of the number of grid-connected customers in Uganda.

Infrastructure
As of May 2020, Umeme was responsible for the grid network at and below 33 kiloVolts. At that time, the physical infrastructure available to Umeme included "over 33 substations and 12,631 transformers". Umeme was in the process of building another substation with two transformers to service the neighborhoods of Nansana, Kakiri and Wakiso, whose power needs are projected to grow between 15 and 20 percent in the next five years (2020–2025). The work will cost US$1.5 million (USh5 billion).

In August 2020, Umeme announced that it was in the process of improving the electricity connections to large industrial consumers in the vicinity of Mukono Township. The company was constructing seven dedicated double circuit supply lines from a substation in the settlement of Mbalala (not Mbarara) to each of (a) Katosi Water Works  (b) Kampala Cement Company Limited (c) Tian Tang Group and (d) Landy Industries Limited, among others. These electrical upgrades, expected to conclude in December 2020, will cost USh12.4 billion (US$3.4 million).

In July 2021, Umeme contracted an Egyptian firm Giza Systems, at a contract fee of USh7 billion (US$2 million), to build a new substation to serve the city of Entebbe. The substation will be constructed on land provided by National Water and Sewerage Corporation (NWSC). Beneficiaries include NWSC pumping and treatment station in Entebbe and Entebbe International Airport, which will receive stable power on a more consistent basis. Construction work is expected to conclude in December 2021.

Negotiation of new contract
In December 2018, President Yoweri Museveni instructed Irene Muloni, Uganda's Energy Minister to begin negotiations with Umeme regarding the renewal of the energy concession, when the current contract expires in 2025. The ministry of energy, the ministry of finance and the office of the attorney general will represent Uganda during these negotiations.

On 13 June 2019, during the reading of the national budget for the financial year 2019/2020, Uganda's Finance Minister, Matia Kasaija indicated that the government will extend Umeme's power distribution concession beyond 2025. Fresh negotiations will be held to finalize the details. Those negotiations started in February 2020.

See also

 List of power stations in Uganda
 West Nile Rural Electrification Company
 Energy in Uganda

References

External links
 Uganda Electricity Regulatory Authority

Energy companies of Uganda
Energy in Uganda
Energy companies established in 2004
Kampala District
Companies listed on the Nairobi Securities Exchange
Companies listed on the Uganda Securities Exchange
2004 establishments in Uganda
Electric power companies of Uganda